The Instituto Lingüístico de Verano A.C. (abbreviated ILV, in ) is a non-profit organization incorporated in Mexico with the legal status of a civil association (Asociación Civil). It is the affiliate body in Mexico to the overarching parent organization SIL International, a worldwide U.S.-based evangelical Protestant organization that sponsors the study, documentation and development of indigenous and minority languages across the world. ILV in Mexico was formally established in 1948, with a stated focus on the study and documentation of the indigenous languages of Mexico and involvement with Mexico's indigenous peoples' affairs generally. The Institute publishes dictionaries, grammars and other literacy and education materials in many of the indigenous languages, and it is also a sponsor of language workshops, presentations and conferences. As a body with ongoing degrees of association and sponsorship of Christian missionary activities and goals, ILV also works to produce translations of Biblical texts in local languages.

While its work in the fields of linguistics and cultural anthropology has been lauded and recognized as substantial and positive contributions in many quarters, some of the ILV's activities have also attracted criticism and controversy with a number of anthropologists and other commentators severely criticizing its relations with Evangelical proselytism, and also alleging political involvement, pro-U.S. stance and acculturation policies.

Notes

References
 
 
Hvalkof, Søren, and Peter Aaby (eds.): Is God an American? An Anthropological Perspective on the Missionary Work of the Summer Institute of Linguistics (A Survival International Document, International Workgroup for Indigenous Affairs, Copenhagen/London 1981), .
Stoll, David. 1983 Fishers of Men or Founders of Empire? The Wycliffe Bible Translators in Latin America. A US Evangelical Mission in the Third World (London, Zed Press 1983)
Todd Hartch. 2006. Missionaries of the State: The Summer Institute of Linguistics, State Formation, and Indigenous Mexico, 1935–1985. Tuscaloosa: University of Alabama Press, 2006.

External links
 Instituto Lingüístico de Verano A.C., main website 

Non-profit organizations based in Mexico
Evangelical parachurch organizations
Linguistic societies
Mesoamerican studies